The Elbe Project was the name of the first commercial, static high voltage direct current transmission system constructed in the world.  The scheme was based on mercury arc valves.

Experimental installations between Wettingen and Zürich in Switzerland, and Charlottenburg and Moabit, Berlin, were demonstrated between 1933 and 1942. Contracts were signed with AEG and Siemens in 1941, and construction began of a bipolar direct current line from the Vockerode power station near Dessau on the Elbe, to Berlin-Marienfelde, in 1943. The line was designed to transmit 60 megawatts using a symmetrical bipolar operating voltage of +200 kV and −200 kV. Two single-core buried cables with aluminum conductors were used. A piece of the cable used can be seen in the Deutsches Museum, Munich.

While the former converter valve hall at Vockerode Power Plant still exists and was used as a workshop, the corresponding hall at Berlin-Marienfelde, which was situated just north of today's Marienfelde substation, was demolished and replaced by a large hardware store.

The system was never put into service owing to the chaos in Germany at the end of World War II. The Soviets dismantled the system as part of war reparation payments, and reused it in building the 115 kilometre long 200 kV Moscow–Kashira monopolar high voltage direct current line with a maximum transmission rating of 30 megawatts in 1951. This transmission line is no longer operating.

Sites

References

External links

 Power Electronics in Europe
 Modern Power Systems - 100 Years of High Voltage Links, 1 November 2007, retrieved 27 January 2009 

HVDC transmission lines
Research and development in Nazi Germany
Electric power transmission systems in Germany